The 1988 Arizona Wildcats football team represented the University of Arizona in the Pacific-10 Conference (Pac-10) during the 1988 NCAA Division I-A football season.  In their second season under head coach Dick Tomey, the Wildcats compiled a 7–4 record (5–3 against Pac-10 opponents), finished in a tie for third place in the Pac-10, and outscored their opponents, 279 to 218.  The team played its home games in Arizona Stadium in Tucson, Arizona.

The team's statistical leaders included Ronald Veal with 669 passing yards, Alonzo Washington with 651 rushing yards, and Derek Hill with 508 receiving yards. Linebacker Chris Singleton led the team with 118 tackles.

Despite a 7–4 record, the Wildcats were left out of a bowl game due to a lack of bowls available at the time and that most of the bowls involved ranked teams.

Before the season
The Wildcats completed the 1987 season and Tomey’s first year with a 4–4–3 record and tied Arizona State in the rivalry contest. The team spent the offseason looking to improve on their record and return to their winning ways as they did under previous Arizona coach (and then-current USC coach) Larry Smith.

Despite the offseason being held in the shadow of Arizona’s basketball team as a result of its first Final Four appearance and Tomey and his players supporting them, the team continued to rebuild and prepared for the upcoming season.

Schedule

Personnel

Season summary

at Oregon State

Texas Tech
After earning a win in the opener at Oregon State, Arizona played its first home game of the season against Texas Tech. This was the first meeting between the two teams since they played in nine straight seasons from 1971–79. After falling behind early, the Wildcats dominated the rest of the way and came away with the win.

at Oklahoma

The Wildcats traveled to Oklahoma in their first ever matchup against the Sooners. Despite playing tough, Arizona could not keep up with the fourth-ranked Sooners and eventually lost.

Eastern Michigan

USC
The Wildcats welcomed former coach Larry Smith back to Tucson as Arizona hosted the fourth-ranked Trojans. Several mistakes became a disaster for the Wildcats and USC capitalized on them to break the game open and win big, and Tomey lost to his predecessor for the second consecutive year.

Washington State

UCLA
Arizona hosted top-ranked UCLA in a big test for the Wildcats. Unfortunately, the Wildcats did not have an answer against the Bruins and avoided a shutout with a late field goal, and leading to yet another loss to a top-ten ranked opponent.

California

at Washington
On the road at Washington, Arizona visited the Huskies. In a game that was dominated by both teams’ defense, the Wildcats pulled through with a late field goal and finally captured their first win over Washington in team history.

Oregon

Arizona State

After getting a big homecoming win against Oregon, the Wildcats hosted Arizona State in a rivalry duel. Late in the first half before intermission, with the Sun Devils leading 18–14, Wildcat quarterback Ronald Veal threw a Hail Mary pass that was caught by receiver Derek Hill, who then ran to the end zone for a touchdown and Arizona led 21–18 at the break. The play gave the Wildcats the lead for good as they would not trail again and won it and extended their unbeaten streak over ASU to seven (including the 1987 tie). Veal’s Hail Mary pass was referred to Arizona fans as the “Hail Veal”, “Hill Veal”, “Veal Mary” or simply “The Pass”, which was added to many other memorable play in the rivalry’s history. The win ended the regular season and Arizona became bowl-eligible.

Awards and honors
 Dana Wells, DL, Pac-10 defensive player of the year and Morris Trophy winner (defense), First-team All-Pac-10
 Joe Tofflemire, OL, Pac-10 Morris Trophy winner (offense)

Season notes
 The Wildcats improved on their 1987 record and achieved their goals with a winning season in 1988.
 Three of Arizona’s four losses were to ranked teams, all of which were ranked in the top ten.
 Arizona had somewhat of a difficult schedule, but managed to win more games. Even though the Wildcats won seven games, they were snubbed from a bowl spot, with losses to ranked opponents, strength of schedule, and a lack of bowls at the time, were factors in them missing the postseason.
 This season was the first in which a former Arizona coach faced his successor at least two seasons after leaving the school. Smith’s Trojans had also defeated Tomey’s Wildcats in 1987.
 Due to Pac-10 scheduling, the Wildcats played eight home games and only three road ones. At one point during the season, Arizona played at home for five consecutive games, which was the longest span for the team since they 1979, when they also played five straight home games.
 Arizona’s win over ASU was Tomey’s first of several victories against his rivals. The final score (28–18) was identical to the 1982 meeting that began the Wildcats’ dominance over the Sun Devils.
 With nose tackle Dana Wells being awarded the Pac-10 defensive player of the year, Arizona won the conference’s defensive award for the third straight season.
 Arizona would sweep the Pac-10’s Morris Trophy awards, with lineman Joe Tofflemire winning on the offensive side and Wells on the defensive.
 Although it was overshadowed by its basketball counterpart due to its Final Four run earlier in the year, the football program managed to end the season on a winning note.

References

Arizona
Arizona Wildcats football seasons
Arizona Wildcats football